Hemilienardia thyridota is a species of sea snail, a marine gastropod mollusk in the family Raphitomidae.

Description
The length of the shell attains 4.5 mm, its diameter 2 mm.

(Original description) This is a pure white, curtly pyramidal species, the surface not shining. It contains six turreted whorls, angled at the suture, ventricose, longitudinally thickly ribbed, transversely ornamented with few lirations. In the middle of the upper whorl and doubly-ranked in the body whorl, are transverse regular deep pittings, squarrose, profound, between the ribs, which suggest the trivial name (from Ancient Greek : thyridotos : furnished with windows or doors). The aperture is narrowly oblique. The outer lip is thickened and furnished with four strong denticles. The columellar teeth are more obscure and feeble. The sinus goes deep into the outer lip.

Distribution
This marine species occurs off the Loyalty Islands, Mactan Island, the Philippines and off Gulf of Carpentaria to Queensland, Australia

References

 Bouge, L.J. & Dautzenberg, P.L. 1914. Les Pleurotomides de la Nouvelle-Caledonie et de ses dependances. Journal de Conchyliologie 61: 123–214 
 Powell, A.W.B. 1966. The molluscan families Speightiidae and Turridae, an evaluation of the valid taxa, both Recent and fossil, with list of characteristic species. Bulletin of the Auckland Institute and Museum. Auckland, New Zealand 5: 1–184, pls 1–23

External links
  Hedley, C. 1922. A revision of the Australian Turridae. Records of the Australian Museum 13(6): 213-359, pls 42-56 
 
 Gastropods.com: Hemilienardia thyridota 

thyridota
Gastropods described in 1896